The 1959 Mississippi gubernatorial election took place on November 3, 1959, in order to elect the Governor of Mississippi. Incumbent Democrat James P. Coleman was term-limited, and could not run for reelection to a second term. As was common at the time, the Democratic candidate ran unopposed in the general election so therefore the Democratic primary was the real contest, and winning the primary was considered tantamount to election.

Democratic primary
After the Brown ruling about school desegregation and the 1957 Little Rock Crisis, the defense of segregation and white supremacy across the South became a paramount concern, and all candidates ran as segregationists.

Ross Barnett, who already ran on 1951 and 1955, ran with the support of the Citizens' Councils, former Bilbo partisans and the covert help of Senator James Eastland as a "vigorous segregationist", as he told himself.

Carroll Gartin ran in the continuity of Coleman.

Sullivan was relatively more moderate on the race subject; he also ran on a promise to end prohibition. He received covert help from Eastland, who wanted to hamstrung Gartin.

Robert Mason was a perennial candidate who ran on a white supremacy platform, promising to have money printed to fund Mississippi budget: "They’re turning out the money on those free presses. And that’s good. Let’em keep turning some of that free press money to Mississippi". He opposed he end of prohibition. He said he saved money so that, every two or three years, he could either travel or run for governor, adding that he did so on the suggestion of his wife.

No candidate received a majority in the Democratic primary, which featured 4 contenders, so a runoff was held between the top two candidates. The runoff election was won by trial lawyer Ross Barnett, who defeated Lieutenant Governor Carroll Gartin; both ran as rabid segregationists to the dismay of the relatively more moderate incumbent Coleman, each one trying to tar the other side with association with pro-integration forces.

Results

Runoff

General election
In the general election, Barnett ran unopposed.

Results

References

1959
gubernatorial
Mississippi
November 1959 events in the United States